John Houston is a Canadian para-alpine skier. He represented Canada at the 1988 Winter Paralympics.

He competed in the Men's Downhill B1 and the Men's Giant Slalom B1 events.

He won the bronze medal in the Men's Giant Slalom B1 event. He was disqualified in the Men's Downhill B1 event.

See also 
 List of Paralympic medalists in alpine skiing

References 

Living people
Year of birth missing (living people)
Place of birth missing (living people)
Paralympic alpine skiers of Canada
Alpine skiers at the 1988 Winter Paralympics
Medalists at the 1988 Winter Paralympics
Paralympic bronze medalists for Canada
Paralympic medalists in alpine skiing